The men's 4 × 110 yards relay event at the 1958 British Empire and Commonwealth Games was held on 26 July at the Cardiff Arms Park in Cardiff, Wales.

Medalists

Results

Heats

Qualification: First 3 teams of each heat (Q) qualified directly for the final.

Final

References

Athletics at the 1958 British Empire and Commonwealth Games
1958